Milton Keynes Irish Football Club is a football club based in Fenny Stratford, a constituent town of Milton Keynes, Buckinghamshire, England.

History
The club was established in May 2020 by a merger of Milton Keynes Robins, Unite MK and Milton Keynes Irish Veterans. In 2021 the club were promoted to the Premier Division based on their results in the abandoned 2019–20 and 2020–21 seasons. In May 2022, Milton Keynes Irish announced their reserve team would fold.

References

External links
Official website

Football clubs in England
Football clubs in Buckinghamshire
Sport in Milton Keynes
2020 establishments in England
Association football clubs established in 2020
Spartan South Midlands Football League
Diaspora association football clubs in England